Incurvaria takeuchii is a moth of the family Incurvariidae. It is found on the main island (Honshu) of Japan.

The wingspan is 15.5–19 mm for males and 10.5–18 mm for females. The forewings are glossy blackish-brown.

The larvae feed on Clethra barbinervis. They create and oval ellipsoidal case consisting of three pieces. The larva overwinters on the ground. Pupation takes place in spring.

References

Moths described in 1957
Incurvariidae
Moths of Japan